Pierre Batcheff (Russian: Пьер Батчефф; 23 June 1901? – 13 April 1932) was a French actor of Russian origin. He became a popular film actor from the mid-1920s until the early 1930s, and among his best-known work was the surrealist short film Un chien andalou (1929), made by Luis Buñuel in collaboration with Salvador Dalí. After appearing in about twenty-five films, he died at an early age from a drug overdose.

Life
Pierre Batcheff was born in Harbin in China and he grew up in Saint Petersburg. (One source says that his birth name was Benjamin Batcheff and that he adopted the name Pierre later from his father.) When war broke out in 1914, his family were on holiday in Switzerland and they decided to remain there, at first in Lausanne and then Geneva. Batcheff's father went bankrupt around 1917, leaving the family in financial difficulty, and Pierre started taking small parts in Georges Pitoëff's theatre company in Geneva. Between 1919 and 1921 he attended the Collège Calvin. In 1921, Batcheff moved with his family to Paris where he worked at first as a theatre actor.

Batcheff's earliest leading role in the cinema was in 1923 in Claudine et le poussin, in the first of several performances as a young aristocratic lover.  In the next few years he made films with Marcel L'Herbier, Jean Epstein, and Abel Gance.  By 1927 he was established as a popular young leading man, with interviews and covers photos in film magazines. He was at the same time dissatisfied with the type of roles which he was offered and he cultivated links with avant-garde circles, especially the surrealists. In 1927 he met Luis Buñuel and their discussions led to their subsequent collaboration on Un chien andalou in the following year.

In 1926 Batcheff met Denise Piazza, the daughter of a publisher, and they married in 1930. As Denise Batcheff, and later Denise Tual, she became a film editor and producer.

In the ten years of his film career, Batcheff made around 25 films. At the time of his death, he was engaged in a project with Jacques Prévert to write and direct a film which proved to be sufficiently radical to alarm some financial backers. Batcheff's behaviour showed signs of stress and became increasingly erratic, and in April 1932 he died from an overdose of drugs, possibly by suicide.

One of the Parisian newspapers reporting on his death summarised his contemporary appeal as an actor: "As an artist, he brought an extremely personal tone of refinement, of sensitivity and of melancholy, which was not devoid of strength, and this earned him a very wide popularity".  It also noted that on the day after his death he had been due to sign a contract with a producer to direct his first film.

Filmography

Bibliography
 Powrie, Phil & Rebillard, Éric. Pierre Batcheff and stardom in 1920s French cinema. Edinburgh University Press, 2009
 Tual, Denise. Au cœur du temps.  Paris: Carrère, 1987.

References

External links
 

1900s births
1932 deaths
Year of birth uncertain
20th-century French male actors
Male actors from Paris
Male actors from Saint Petersburg
French male silent film actors
French male stage actors
Emigrants from the Russian Empire to France
Actors from Geneva
Emigrants from the Russian Empire to Switzerland
Burials at Montparnasse Cemetery
Burials at Sainte-Geneviève-des-Bois Russian Cemetery
Drug-related suicides in France
Barbiturates-related deaths
1932 suicides